An Experience to Die For: Be a Wicked Woman, also known as Angel, Become an Evil Woman, is a 1990 South Korean film premiered in 2021, directed by Kim Ki-young.

Synopsis
Two women with unfaithful husbands make a deal to kill each other's husbands.

Release
Produced in 1990, Kim was so disappointed with the outcome that he chose not to release it. The film was submitted to the censors twice — once in 1990 and again in 1995, under the new title 죽어도 좋은 경혐 (Jukeodo joeun gyeonghuom) — but was not screened for the public until the 1998 Busan International Film Festival, following Kim's untimely death in a house fire.

Cast
 Youn Yuh-jung as Choi Yuh-jung
 Hyun Kill-soo as Jeong Dong-sik
 Lee Tam-mi as Lee Myoung-ja
 Kim Byeong-hak as Kim Woon-seok

See also
 Throw Momma from the Train, a comedy with a similar premise.

Notes

External links 
 
 

2021 films
2020s Korean-language films
Films directed by Kim Ki-young
South Korean drama films
2021 drama films